The Gyeonggi Suwon International School (GSIS) is an international school located in Suwon, Gyeonggi Province, South Korea. GSIS is one of two schools in South Korea accredited by the IBO to offer all three programs: the PYP, MYP and DP. It opened on September 16, 2006 and educates students in junior kindergarten (ages 3–4) to Grade 12.

Athletics
GSIS athletic teams, the Knights, compete in the Korea-American Interscholastic Activities Conference.

References

External links
Official website
International Baccalaureate Organization

International schools in South Korea
International Baccalaureate schools in South Korea
Christian schools in South Korea
Nondenominational Christian schools
Schools in Suwon
Educational institutions established in 2006
2006 establishments in South Korea